Bosniaks are a Slavic Muslim ethnic group living in Kosovo, numbering 27,553 according to the 2011 census. Because this census was boycotted by most Kosovo Serbs, leaving the Serb population underrepresented, Bosniaks were recorded as being the second-largest ethnic group in Kosovo, after the Kosovo Albanians. The vast majority of Bosniaks are adherents of Sunni Islam.

Demographics
The 2011 census states the number of Bosniaks in Kosovo are 27,553, with around 21,000 of them living in the municipalities of Prizren and Dragaš. Bosniaks make up 1.6% of the whole population.

History
Persons with the attribute "Boşnak" or "from Bosnia" are seldom mentioned among 15th century Ottoman defters. The overwhelming majority of Bosniaks in Kosovo settled in the 18th, 19th and 20th century during the Ottoman era, mostly after the Congress of Berlin, but also after its fall during the First and Second World Wars. They consist of Slavic-speaking Muslims who largely originate from Sandžak, but also from Montenegro (Plav and Gusinje in particular), Bosnia, Serbia, and Croatia. The majority of them settled in Peja, Istok, Prizren and Mitrovica. Another group includes Slavic Muslims who already resided in Southern Kosovo in the areas around Prizren, Gora and Zupa. The ethnonym "Bosniak" in Kosovo is used by several distinct Slavic Muslim groups which came to form the Bosniaks of Kosovo. It was adopted by these groups as a collective identifier largely after 1999. Some Slavic-speaking Muslims identify interchangeably or exclusively as Gorani.

Politics
There are several Bosniak political parties in Kosovo and the oldest one is Bosniak Party of Democratic Action of Kosovo (Bošnjačka stranka demokratske akcije Kosova).

Current Status
Following the end of the Kosovo War, Bosniaks faced ongoing discrimination by Albanians who associated them with Serbs. Between 1999 and 2001, 80 Bosniaks went missing, were killed or injured. Bosniaks encounter high unemployment and poor education in Kosovo due to a lack of schools conducting studies in the Bosnian language. The return of Bosniaks who escaped Kosovo during the Kosovo War has been a slow process. Many are instead opting to sell their homes to leave for Bosnia and Herzegovina and Western Europe.

Notable people 

 Duda Balje, politician
 Emilija Redžepi, politician
 Adrijana Hodžić, politician

See also
Bosniaks

References

Ethnic groups in Kosovo
Muslim communities in Europe
 
Bosniak diaspora